Treva McGregor (born 1 June 1947) is  a former Australian rules footballer who played with Fitzroy in the Victorian Football League (VFL). 	

McGregor is the last VFL (now AFL) footballer to win the Stawell Gift. He ran 2nd in 1970 before returning in 1971 to win. He was trained by Jim Spain who had been coaching for 34 years before guiding McGregor to win the Stawell Gift. 

McGregor retired from football and became 'world' professional sprint champion in 1973 after winning all four races over 60, 100, 120 and 200 metres. In 1974 he relinquished the world professional sprint championship to George McNeill. In 1975 he was third in the championship to Jean-Louis Ravelomanantsoa and Warren Edmonson. Suffering from achilles tendon problems, McGregor retired from athletics after his third place in a 1976 Stawell Gift semi final.  

McGregor worked as a teacher. He was a high school principal for many years before retiring in 2002.

Notes

External links 		
		
	
		
		
Living people		
1947 births		
Australian rules footballers from Victoria (Australia)		
Fitzroy Football Club players
Sandhurst Football Club players
Stawell Gift winners